Liam Dick (born 19 August 1995) is a Scottish professional footballer who plays for Scottish Championship side Raith Rovers.

Career
A member of Falkirk's Under 19 team, Dick made his first team debut as a substitute in Falkirk's win over Dundee United on penalties in the Scottish League Cup on 25 October 2011. In the last game of the season, he made his league debut, coming on as a substitute towards the end of the 3–2 win over Ayr United. In January 2013, Dick, along with Ryan McGeever, signed with Falkirk until 2016.

In November 2015, Dick signed a short-term loan deal with Scottish League One side Stranraer. After impressing in his performances for Stranrer, on 4 January 2016, he signed an extension to keep him on loan at Stair Park until the end of the season. In June 2016, Dick signed for Stranraer on a permanent basis.

After two-and-a-half seasons at Stair Park, he agreed to join Scottish Championship side Dumbarton on 1 January 2018. After the Sons relegation to League One Dick turned down a new deal and left the club in May 2018

Dick then signed for Alloa Athletic in July 2018.

Career statistics

Honours
 Raith Rovers
Scottish Challenge Cup : 2021-22

References

External links

Living people
Falkirk F.C. players
Stranraer F.C. players
Association football defenders
Scottish Football League players
Scottish Professional Football League players
1995 births
Footballers from Stirling
Dumbarton F.C. players
Alloa Athletic F.C. players
Scottish footballers
Raith Rovers F.C. players